Interatomic potentials are mathematical functions to calculate the potential energy of a system of atoms with given positions in space. Interatomic potentials are widely used as the physical basis of molecular mechanics and molecular dynamics simulations in computational chemistry, computational physics and computational materials science to explain and predict materials properties. Examples of quantitative properties and qualitative phenomena that are explored with interatomic potentials include lattice parameters, surface energies, interfacial energies, adsorption, cohesion, thermal expansion, and elastic and plastic material behavior, as well as chemical reactions.

Functional form 
Interatomic potentials can be written as a series expansion of
functional terms that depend on the position of one, two, three, etc.
atoms at a time. Then the total potential of the system  can
be written as 

Here  is the one-body term,  the two-body term,  the
three body term,  the number of atoms in the system,
 the position of atom , etc.
that loop over atom positions.

Note that in case the pair potential is given per atom pair, in the two-body
term the potential should be multiplied by 1/2 as otherwise each bond is counted
twice, and similarly the three-body term by 1/6. Alternatively,
the summation of the pair term can be restricted to cases 
and similarly for the three-body term , if
the potential form is such that it is symmetric with respect to exchange
for multielemental systems).

The one-body term is only meaningful if the atoms are in an external
field (e.g. an electric field). In the absence of external fields,
the potential  should not depend on the absolute position of
atoms, but only on the relative positions. This means
that the functional form can be rewritten as a function
of interatomic distances 
and angles between the bonds
(vectors to neighbours) .
Then, in the absence of external forces, the general
form becomes

In the three-body term  the
interatomic distance  is not needed
since the three terms 
are sufficient to give the relative positions of three atoms  in three-dimensional space. Any terms of order higher than
2 are also called many-body potentials.
In some interatomic potentials the many-body interactions are 
embedded into the terms of a pair potential (see discussion on
EAM-like and bond order potentials below).

In principle the sums in the expressions run over all  atoms.
However, if the range of the interatomic potential is finite,
some cutoff distance ,
the summing can be restricted to atoms within the cutoff
distance of each other. By also using a cellular method
for finding the neighbours, the MD algorithm can be
an O(N) algorithm. Potentials with an infinite
range can be summed up efficiently by Ewald summation
and its further developments.

Force calculation 

The forces acting between atoms can be obtained by differentiation of
the total energy with respect to atom positions. That is,
to get the force on atom  one should take the three-dimensional
derivative (gradient) of the potential  with respect to the position of atom :

  
For two-body potentials this gradient reduces, thanks to the
differentiation with respect to the interatomic distances
. However, for many-body
potentials (three-body, four-body, etc.) the differentiation
becomes considerably more complex 

since the potential may not be any longer symmetric with respect to  exchange.
In other words, also the energy
of atoms  that are not direct neighbours of  can depend on the position 
because of angular and other many-body terms, and hence contribute to the gradient
.

Classes of interatomic potentials 
Interatomic potentials come in many different varieties, with
different physical motivations. Even for single well-known elements such as silicon, 
a wide variety of potentials quite different in functional form and motivation have been developed.
The true interatomic interactions
are quantum mechanical in nature, and there is no known
way in which the true interactions described by
the Schrödinger equation or Dirac equation for
all electrons and nuclei could be cast into an analytical
functional form. Hence all analytical interatomic
potentials are by necessity approximations.

Over time interatomic potentials have largely grown more complex and more accurate, although this is not strictly true. This has included both increased descriptions of physics, as well as added parameters. Until recently, all interatomic potentials could be described as "parametric", having been developed and optimized with a fixed number of (physical) terms and parameters. New research focuses instead on non-parametric potentials which can be systematically improvable by using complex local atomic neighbor descriptors and separate mappings to predict system properties,  such that the total number of terms and parameters are flexible.  These non-parametric models can be significantly more accurate, but since they are not tied to physical forms and parameters, there are many potential issues surrounding extrapolation and uncertainties.

Parametric potentials

Pair potentials 
The arguably simplest widely used interatomic interaction model is the Lennard-Jones potential 

where  is the depth of the potential well
The attractive term proportional to in the potential comes from the scaling of van der Waals forces, while the  repulsive term is much more approximate (conveniently the square of the attractive term). On its own, this potential is quantitatively accurate only for noble gases and has been extensively studied in the past decades, but is also widely used for qualitative studies and in systems where dipole interactions are significant, particularly in chemistry force fields to describe intermolecular interactions - especially in fluids.

Another simple and widely used pair potential is the
Morse potential, which consists simply of a sum of two exponentials.

Here  is the equilibrium bond energy and
 the bond distance. The Morse
potential has been applied to studies of molecular vibrations and solids 
, and also inspired the functional form of more accurate potentials such as the bond-order potentials.

Ionic materials are often described by a sum of a 
short-range repulsive term, such as the
Buckingham pair potential, and a long-range Coulomb potential
giving the ionic interactions between the ions forming the material. The short-range
term for ionic materials can also be of many-body character
.

Pair potentials have some inherent limitations, such as the inability
to describe all 3 elastic constants of
cubic metals or correctly describe both cohesive energy and vacancy formation energy. Therefore quantitative molecular dynamics simulations 
are carried out with various of many-body potentials.

Repulsive potentials 

For very short interatomic separations, important in radiation material science,
the interactions can be described quite accurately with screened Coulomb potentials which have the general form
 

A widely used popular screening function is the "Universal ZBL" one.
and more accurate ones can be obtained from all-electron quantum chemistry calculations

In binary collision approximation simulations this kind of potential can be used
to describe the nuclear stopping power.

Many-body potentials 
The Stillinger-Weber potential is a potential that has a 
two-body and three-body terms of the standard form

where the three-body term describes how the potential energy changes with bond bending.
It was originally developed for pure Si, but has been extended to many other
elements and compounds

 
and also formed the basis for other Si potentials.

Metals are very commonly described with what can be called
"EAM-like" potentials, i.e. potentials that share
the same functional form as the embedded atom model.
In these potentials, the total potential energy is written

where  is a so-called embedding function
(not to be confused with the force ) that is a function of the sum of the so-called electron density
.  
is a pair potential that usually is purely repulsive. In the original
formulation  the electron
density function  was obtained
from true atomic electron densities, and the embedding function
was motivated from density-functional theory as the energy needed
to 'embed' an atom into the electron density. 
.
However, many other potentials used for metals share the same functional
form but motivate the terms differently, e.g. based
on tight-binding theory

or other motivations

.

EAM-like potentials are usually implemented as numerical tables.
A collection of tables is available at the interatomic
potential repository at NIST 

Covalently bonded materials are often described by 
bond order potentials, sometimes also called
Tersoff-like or Brenner-like potentials.

These have in general a form that resembles a pair potential:

where the repulsive and attractive part are simple exponential
functions similar to those in the Morse potential.
However, the strength is modified by the environment of the atom  via the term. If implemented without
an explicit angular dependence,  these potentials
can be shown to be mathematically equivalent to 
some varieties of EAM-like potentials

Thanks to this equivalence, the bond-order potential formalism has been implemented also for many metal-covalent mixed materials.

EAM potentials have also been extended to describe covalent bonding by adding angular-dependent terms to the electron density function , in what is called the modified embedded atom method (MEAM).

Force fields 

A force field is the collection of parameters to describe the physical interactions between atoms or physical units (up to ~108) using a given energy expression. The term force field characterizes the collection of parameters for a given interatomic potential (energy function) and is often used within the computational chemistry community. The force field parameters make the difference between good and poor models. Force fields are used for the simulation of metals, ceramics, molecules, chemistry, and biological systems, covering the entire periodic table and multiphase materials. Today's performance is among the best for solid-state materials, molecular fluids, and for biomacromolecules, whereby biomacromolecules were the primary focus of force fields from the 1970s to the early 2000s. Force fields range from relatively simple and interpretable fixed-bond models (e.g. Interface force field, CHARMM, and COMPASS) to explicitly reactive models with many adjustable fit parameters (e.g. ReaxFF) and machine learning models.

Non-parametric potentials 

It should first be noted that non-parametric potentials are often referred to as "machine learning" potentials. While the descriptor/mapping forms of non-parametric models are closely related to machine learning in general and their complex nature make machine learning fitting optimizations almost necessary, differentiation is important in that parametric models can also be optimized using machine learning.

Current research in interatomic potentials involves using systematically improvable, non-parametric mathematical forms and increasingly complex machine learning methods. The total energy is then writtenwhere is a mathematical representation of the atomic environment surrounding the atom , known as the descriptor.  is a machine-learning model that provides a prediction for the energy of atom  based on the descriptor output. An accurate machine-learning potential requires both a robust descriptor and a suitable machine learning framework. The simplest descriptor is the set of interatomic distances from atom  to its neighbours, yielding a machine-learned pair potential. However, more complex many-body descriptors are needed to produce highly accurate potentials.  It is also possible to use a linear combination of multiple descriptors with associated machine-learning models. Potentials have been constructed using a variety of machine-learning methods, descriptors, and mappings, including neural networks, Gaussian process regression, and linear regression.

A non-parametric potential is most often trained to total energies, forces, and/or stresses obtained from quantum-level calculations, such as density functional theory, as with most modern potentials. However, the accuracy of a machine-learning potential can be converged to be comparable with the underlying quantum calculations, unlike analytical models. Hence, they are in general more accurate than traditional analytical potentials, but they are correspondingly less able to extrapolate. Further, owing to the complexity of the machine-learning model and the descriptors, they are computationally far more expensive than their analytical counterparts.

Non-parametric, machine learned potentials may also be combined with parametric, analytical potentials, for example to include known physics such as the screened Coulomb repulsion, or to impose physical constraints on the predictions.

Potential fitting 
Since the interatomic potentials are approximations, they by necessity all involve
parameters that need to be adjusted to some reference values. In simple
potentials such as the Lennard-Jones and Morse ones, the parameters are interpretable and can be set to match e.g. the equilibrium bond length and bond strength
of a dimer molecule or the surface energy of a solid
. Lennard-Jones potential can typically describe the lattice parameters, surface energies, and approximate mechanical properties. Many-body
potentials often contain tens or even hundreds of adjustable parameters with limited interpretability and no compatibility with common interatomic potentials for bonded molecules.
Such parameter sets can be fit to a larger set of experimental data, or materials
properties derived from less reliable data such as from density-functional theory. For solids, a many-body potential
can often describe the lattice constant of the equilibrium crystal structure, the cohesive energy, and linear elastic constants, as well as basic point defect properties of all the elements and stable compounds well, although deviations in surface energies often exceed 50%.

Non-parametric potentials in turn contain hundreds or even thousands of independent parameters to fit. For any but the simplest model forms, sophisticated optimization and machine learning methods are necessary for useful potentials. 

The aim of most potential functions and fitting is to make the potential
transferable, i.e. that it can describe materials properties that are clearly
different from those it was fitted to (for examples of potentials explicitly aiming for this,
see e.g.). Key aspects here are the correct representation of chemical bonding, validation of structures and energies, as well as interpretability of all parameters. Full transferability and interpretability is reached with the Interface force field (IFF). An example of partial transferability, a review of interatomic potentials
of Si describes that Stillinger-Weber and Tersoff III potentials for Si can describe several (but not all) materials properties they were not fitted to.

The NIST interatomic potential repository provides a collection of fitted interatomic potentials, either as fitted parameter values or numerical
tables of the potential functions. The OpenKIM  project also provides a repository of fitted potentials, along with collections of validation tests and a software framework for promoting reproducibility in molecular simulations using interatomic potentials.

Reliability of interatomic potentials 
Classical interatomic potentials often exceed the accuracy of simplified quantum mechanical methods such as density functional theory at a million times lower computational cost. The use of interatomic potentials is recommended for the simulation of nanomaterials, biomacromolecules, and electrolytes from atoms up to millions of atoms at the 100 nm scale and beyond. As a limitation, electron densities and quantum processes at the local scale of hundreds of atoms are not included. When of interest, higher level quantum chemistry methods can be locally used. 

The robustness of a model at different conditions other than those used in the fitting process is often measured in terms of transferability of the potential.

See also 
 Computational chemistry
 Computational materials science
 Molecular dynamics
 Force field (chemistry)

References

External links 
 NIST interatomic potential repository
 NIST JARVIS-FF
 Open Knowledgebase of Interatomic Models (OpenKIM)

Condensed matter physics
Computational physics
Materials science
Quantum mechanical potentials